Pygmaeothamnus is a monotypic genus of flowering plants in the family Rubiaceae. It was described by Walter Robyns in 1928 and originally held four species. It is found in central and southern Africa.

Species
 Pygmaeothamnus zeyheri (Sond.) Robyns

References

External links
 World Checklist of Rubiaceae

Rubiaceae genera
Vanguerieae